Howard Eugene "Stretch" Johnson (30 January 1915 – 28 May 2000) was a tap dancer and social activist.

In 1936, he joined his brother Bobby and his sister, Winnie, one of the featured dancers at the Cotton Club, to form an act called the Three Johnsons, which was featured in New Faces of 1936 and the Duke Ellington Revue of 1937 at the Apollo Theater. He later acted in a Harlem production of Clifford Odets play Waiting for Lefty.

A member of the N.A.A.C.P. since he was 15, he served in the 92nd 'Buffalo' Division in World War II, winning two Purple Hearts.

Johnson joined the Young Communist League of Harlem in 1940, prompted in part by lynchings in the American South and remained in the Communist Party USA until the late 1950s when he and many other members left over Khrushchev's revelations about Stalin.

He became a printer, and worked at The New York Times. He earned a high school equivalency diploma and then a degree from Columbia University. Johnson subsequently taught black studies at the Fieldston School and later taught sociology at the State University of New York at New Paltz.

In Hawaii in the 1980s, Johnson served as the first editor of the Afro-Hawaiian News, the state's only African-American newspaper at the time. Under his leadership, the newspaper successfully advocated for making Martin Luther King Jr. Day a state holiday in Hawaii.

Works cited

References

External links
Photo with Cab Calloway and Edna Robinson (24 Dec 1984) Jet
Finding aid to the Howard "Stretch" Johnson papers at Columbia University
Interview, Oral History of the American Left

1915 births
2000 deaths
American tap dancers
American male dancers
Editors of Hawaii newspapers
State University of New York at New Paltz faculty
Columbia University alumni
20th-century American dancers